Herbert Panse (6 March 1914 – 25 August 1980) was a German international footballer who played as a midfielder.

References

1914 births
1980 deaths
Association football midfielders
German footballers
Germany international footballers
Footballers from Dresden
German football managers
Altonaer FC von 1893 managers